Harald Bjørlykke (14 September 1901 – 28 February 1968) was a Norwegian geologist.

Biography
He was born in Ås in Akershus, Norway. He was a son of Knut Olai Bjørlykke (1860–1946), who was a professor of geology at Ås.
 
He was the father of  geologist Arne Bjørlykke.
 
He took the dr.philos. degree from the University of Oslo in 1935.
From 1937 to 1946 he was a lecturer in mineralogy and crystallography at Norwegian Institute of Technology. 
He was a state geologist at the Geological Survey of Norway 1946–1951. 
He became head of Norsk Bergverk in 1952 and was chief geologist at Søve mines in Ulefoss. 
In 1958, he became director of the Norwegian Geological Survey.  
He was professor of geology at the  Norwegian Institute of Technology from 1966.

Bjørlykke received the Reusch Medal (Reusch-Medaljen) from the Norwegian Geological Society in 1939. He died during 1968 at  Trondheim.

References

1901 births
1968 deaths
20th-century Norwegian geologists
Norwegian mineralogists
Academic staff of the Norwegian Institute of Technology
Royal Norwegian Society of Sciences and Letters
People from Ås, Akershus